A bread warmer can describe a number of different devices used to keep bread from cooling too fast. Examples include baskets with cloths, ceramic disks, or cabinets placed over a heat source such as steam radiators.

Types of Bread Warmers 
Now while baskets, cloths, and the windowsills are all great contributions to the bread warming community, in our new technological age, we see more ways to keep bread warm and even reheat it after being cooked. Many new electric bread warmers can keep your bread warm so long as they are plugged in and working!

 Toaster Oven
 Insulated Bags
 Warming Stone
 Classic Oven

Kitchenware